Akudibashevo (Akudibaş) is a rural locality (a selo) in Kusekeyevsky Selsoviet, Birsky District, Bashkortostan, Russia. The population was 270 as of 2010. There are 7 streets.

Geography 
Akudibashevo is located 21 km southwest of Birsk (the district's administrative centre) by road. Penkovo is the nearest rural locality.

References 

Rural localities in Birsky District